Ilisoni Vonomateiratu is a professional rugby league footballer. He is a Fijian international.

References

External links
Fiji v France: Teams

1981 births
Living people
Fijian rugby league players
Fiji national rugby league team players
I-Taukei Fijian people
Parkes Spacemen players
Rugby league props